This is a list of reeves and mayors of St. Thomas, Ontario, Canada. St. Thomas was incorporated as a village in 1852, as a town in 1861, and as a city in 1881.

Village reeves
1852–1855 — David Parish
1856–1856 — Edward Ermatinger
1857–1857 — Asa Howard
1858–1858 — Thomas Arkell
1859–1859 — Archibald McIntyre
1860–1860 — Dr. George Southwick

Town reeve
1861–1861 — Archilbald McInytre

Town mayors
1861–1861 — M.T.Moore
1862–1864 — Dr. George Southwick
1865–1871 — Thomas Arkell
1872–1872 — Archibald McLachlin
1873–1876 — Daniel Drake
1877–1878 — Dr. D. McLarty
1879–1880 — John E Smith

City mayors

1881–1900
1881–1882 — Dr. William C. VanBuskirk 
1883–1883 — Dr. Eliphalet Wilbur Gustin
1884–1885 — Edward Horton
1886–1886 — John E. Smith
1887–1888 — John Midgley
1889–1890 — Israel Morse
1891–1892 — Robert McCully
1893–1894 — George L. Oill
1895–1896 — William E. Idsardi
1897–1898 — Frederick W. Wright
1899–1900 — Patrick Meehan

1901–1950
1901–1902 — Sperrin Chant
1903–1904 — Charles Francis Maxwell
1905–1905 — Thomas Meek
1906–1907 — Calvin Lawrence
1908–1909 — George Geddes
1910–1911 — Dr. Frederick Guest
1912–1913 — Robert N. Price
1914–1915 — Marshall B. Johnson
1916–1917 — William Trott
1918–1919 — Edward A. Horton
1920–1921 — Frank L. Brinkman
1922–1923 — Charles E. Raven
1924–1925 — George H. Sloggett
1926–1927 — John Handford
1928–1929 — William Stokes
1930–1933 — John A. Jagoe
1934–1935 — Angus W. Johnson
1936–1938 — Ernest Duckworth
1939–1940 — Peter Laing, Jr.
1941–1943 — George T. Dyer
1944–1945 — Thomas H. Currah
1946–1946 — Richard A. Sanders
1947–1949 — J. Bruce Caldwell
1950–1950 — Major John F. Peterson

1951–present
1951–1951 — Dr. E. Cecil Gliddon
1952–1954 — Thomas H. Currah
1955–1956 — Peter Laing
1957–1958 — John M. Stirling 
1959–1964 — Vincent A. Barrie
1965–1966 — Donald R. Stokes
1967–1968 — Vincent A. Barrie
1969–1971 — Edward O. Fanjoy
1972–1974 — Eber J. Rice
1975–1976 — M. Wayne Neal
1977–1978 — Cliff Barwick
1978–1980 — Don Hitch
1980–1985 — Doug Tarry
1985–1991 — Janet Golding
1991–1999 — Stephen J. Peters
1999–2000 — Joanne Brooks
2000–2003 — Peter Ostojic
2003–2006 — Jeff Kohler
2006–2010 — Cliff Barwick
2010-2018 — Heather Jackson
2018-present — Joe Preston

References
 Talbot Times, Vol. II, Issue 4, December 1983 — Newsletter of the Elgin County branch of the Ontario Genealogical Society 
 List of leaders in St. Thomas

St. Thomas, Ontario